The Wheatley Sharks are a junior hockey team based in Wheatley, Ontario, Canada.  As of the 2016-17 season the Sharks began play in the Provincial Junior Hockey League of the Ontario Hockey Association.  Previously, they were members of the Great Lakes Junior C Hockey League.

History

The Wheatley Sharks were a member of the Great Lakes Junior C League since 1995–96. The Sharks have made it to the League Finals 4 times since the 2001–02 season but have never been able to win the Championship.

In the 2001–02 season the Sharks faced the Essex 73's in their first ever Finals appearance, the 73's would knock off the Sharks in a hard fought series which Essex won in 5 games, the following year the 73's and Sharks would meet once again in the Championship series, Essex would control this series once again beating the Sharks this time in 4 games.

In 2004–05 the 73's and Sharks would once again meet up this time in the League Semi-Finals which many saw as a battle of the 2 best teams, it would be a classic series, the teams would play Game 7 at the Essex arena in front of over 1500 fans, Sharks held a 2-0 3rd period lead before the 73's battled back with 3 late goals to claim the series victory, Essex would go on to win the Provincial Championship.

The 2005–06 season would be the most successful season in Wheatley Sharks history as Head Coach Dave Wiper led them to a Regular Season Championship with a 1st Place finish with a record of 29–8–1–2. The Club would once again make it to the League Finals for the 3rd time and Face Essex once again this time having the advantage of Home ice, the 73's however would take the title in another classic series going 6 games.

In the 2008–09 season The Sharks would finish 3rd in the league and battle the Belle River Canadiens in first round battle, the Canadiens would take a 3-0 series lead only to see the Sharks battle back and tie the series forcing a game 7 in Belle River. The Canadiens would take the 7th game by a score of 7–1.

The Sharks had another successful season in 2010–11 finishing 21–16–3 would face the Essex 73's once again. The Sharks and 73's were tied 3–3 and another Game 7 in Essex for the Sharks, this time it would be Sharks that would come out on top with a 4–0 shutout win as the Sharks finally defeated the 73's in a playoff series, they would move onto the semi Finals and defeat the 1st place Wallaceburg Lakers in 6 games, however the Sharks lost in a classic 7 game series to the Belle River Canadiens as Belle River won their 2nd straight league title.

The 2011–12 edition of the Sharks would be a very successful one during the regular season, the club finished with a 24–15–1 record during the regular season, which was good enough for 3rd in the league. During the 2011–12 regular season the Sharks would set a team record with 12 straight wins at the Wheatley Arena and finish with a 16–3–1 home record, it was also a successful season for Kurtis Ouellette who won Defenceman of the year and Riley Babkirk who won Rookie of the year. The regular season success would not continue over to the playoffs though, the Sharks would fall in the 1st round to the Belle River Canadiens in 5 games.

The 2012–13 season would be another successful season in Wheatey. The Sharks would finish the season as the 3rd place team with an impressive record of 24–14–2. The Sharks would draw the 6th Seed Alvinston Flyers in the first round, the Sharks would sweep the Flyers in 4 straight games.  Round 2 would bring their rivals from Belle River, the Canadiens held a 3–2 series lead heading back to Wheatley, the Sharks would force a game 7 with a 4–1 win on home ice, Game 7 would be dominated by the Sharks 4–0 and send Wheatley into the finals against the 73's.  After losing their leading scorer Jon Woelk to a broken ankle in the previous round, and a few key components the 73's would eliminate the Sharks 4 straight to put an end to Wheatley's hopes for a first League Championship.

Season-by-season record

2019-2020 Executive/Staff
 Governor - Darryl Glasier
 Director of Hockey Operations - Darryl Glasier
 General Manager - Thomas Grubb
 Head coach - Josh Carnevale
 Assistant coach - Ian Faubert
 Assistant coach - Paul Gossman
 Assistant coach - Adam Hatt
 Goalie Coach - Marc tremblay
 Strength & Conditioning - Dylan Enns
 Head trainer - Dr. Mark Dubreuil
 Trainer - Ken Dawson
 Equipment Managers - Rick Woelk, Tim Oliphant, Jay Riediger

External links
Sharks Webpage

Great Lakes Junior C Hockey League teams